Sagaznab (also Romanized as Sagaznāb, Sakaznāb, Sakeznāb, Sakīznāb, Sakkeznāb, and Sakznab) is a village in Dodangeh-ye Sofla Rural District, Ziaabad District, Takestan County, Qazvin Province, Iran. At the 2006 census, its population was 166, in 50 families.

References 

Populated places in Takestan County